Pertusa was an ancient city and diocese in Tunisia. It is  now a Catholic titular bishopric.

History 
The Bishopric of Ad Pertusa was centered on the ancient Roman civitas of Pertvsa, which has been identified with ruins at modern El-Haraïria, an outer suburb of Tunis. During the Roman Empire Pertusa was located in the Roman province of Africa Proconsularis and was important enough to become a bishopric, which was suffragan to the nearby Metropolitan, of Carthage.

The town is mentioned in the Antonini Itinerarium.

Titular see 
It was nominally revived in 1933 as a Latin titular see of the lowest (episcopal) in 1933, and has almost constantly been awarded. Its incumbents were mostly secular priests :
 Giorgio Giuseppe Haezaert, Spiritans (C.S.Sp.) (1935.06.18 – 1957.09.29), as first Apostolic Vicar of Northern Katanga (in then Belgian Congo)
 Leonard Philip Cowley (1957.11.28 – 1973.08.18)
 George Kinzie Fitzsimons (1975.05.20 – 1984.03.28)
 Kazimierz Górny (1984.10.26 – 1992.03.25)
 Roberto Rodríguez (1992.11.12 – 1998.06.23)
 Liborius Ndumbukuti Nashenda, Missionary Oblates of Mary Immaculate (O.M.I.) (1998.11.05 – 2004.09.21), as Auxiliary Bishop of Windhoek (capital of Namibia) (1998.11.05 – 2004.09.21), next Metropolitan Archbishop of Windhoek (2004.09.21 – ...) and President of Namibian Catholic Bishop’s Conference (September 2007 – ...)
 Philippe Jean-Charles Jourdan, (2005.04.01 – ...), Apostolic Administrator of Estonia

References

External links 
 GigaCatholic, with titular incumbent biography list

Catholic titular sees in Europe